Jack Holder (born 23 March 1996) in Appin, New South Wales is an Australian speedway rider currently riding for Sheffield Tigers in the British Elite League and Apator Toruń in the Polish Ekstraliga. Jack is a World team champion and his brother Chris Holder is a former World individual champion.

Career
A successful rider in Australia, he came to England and first rode for Plymouth Gladiators in 2015. After two seasons, he rode for both Peterborough Panthers and Poole Pirates in 2017, helping Poole to win the Elite Shield.

Jack Holder finished in sixth place at the 2017 Speedway Under-21 World Championship and 4th in the Jason Crump Classic Cup - considered a warm-up for the Australian Senior Solo Championship. The Boxing Day event (2018) was held in front of more than 2,500 fans and he rode through to the B Final where he beat Jye Etheridge, Mason Campton and Erik Riss and went through to the A Final. However, he finished at the back, while the race was won by older brother Chris Holder. In 2018, he helped Somerset Rebels win the KO Cup.

In 2019, he started the season as number 1 for Poole Pirates but had a shaky start, and his friend and co-rider Brady Kurtz asked fans to be patient while he settled in. “I am sure Jack’s copped enough off social media and everything. He doesn’t need me asking him about it as well. Everyone just needs to let him get on with it – he’s just a kid, let him race his bike!"

In 2021 and 2022, he rode for the Sheffield Tigers in the SGB Premiership 2021 and SGB Premiership 2022. He helped Sheffield win the 2022 League cup and reach the Play off final.

Also in 2022, he competed in every round of the 2022 Speedway Grand Prix and scored 12 points at the British Grand Prix, he eventually finished in 12th place during the 2022 Speedway World Championship, after securing 67 points. He qualified for the 2023 Speedway Grand Prix by virtue of finishing 3rd in the 2023 Speedway Grand Prix Qualification. However, the highlight of his season was winning the 2022 Speedway of Nations for Australia with Max Fricke.

In January 2023, Holder won the Australian Championship for the first time.

Major results

World individual Championship
2020 Speedway Grand Prix - 17th
2022 Speedway Grand Prix - 12th

World team Championships
2022 Speedway of Nations - Winner

References

Living people
1996 births
Australian speedway riders
Peterborough Panthers riders
Poole Pirates riders
Sheffield Tigers riders
Somerset Rebels riders